Cara Black (born November 14, 1951) is a bestselling American mystery writer. She is best known for her Aimée Leduc mystery novels featuring a female Paris-based private investigator. Black is included in the Great Women Mystery Writers by Elizabeth Lindsay 2nd edition. Her first novel Murder in the Marais was nominated for an Anthony Award for best first novel and the third novel in the series, Murder in the Sentier, was Anthony-nominated for Best Novel.

Biography
Black was born in Chicago, Illinois on November 14, 1951. She was educated at Cañada College in California, Sophia University in Yotsuya, Tokyo in Japan, and finished her schooling at San Francisco State University where she earned a bachelor's and master's degrees in education. 

She did not base her popular detective Aimée Leduc on a real person. "I knew I couldn’t write as a French woman, I can’t even tie my scarf the right way," she says, "but I grew up in a Francophile family; my father loved good food and wine, I attended a Catholic school with French nuns and I lived in Europe when I was younger. I interviewed three female detectives in Paris who ran their own detective agency and took qualities from each. It was important to me that Aimée be a young, contemporary woman like the Parisian women I know, have a strong fashion sense and be fierce in her pursuit of justice. The justice that eludes people sometimes in daily life. And that she know much more about computers than I do." 

Nor did she intend to write a series. "I’d like to say I had a master plan but the series with Aimée Leduc has just evolved. "In Murder in the Marais, my first book, I just wanted to tell the story of my friend’s mother, a young Jewish girl who hid in the Marais during the German Occupation of Paris in WWII. My friend’s mother was 14 years old and came home from school one day to find her family gone. She stayed in the apartment, went to school, hoping they would return. A year later, in 1944 at Liberation, she searched for them at the train stations, at the Hotel Lutetia on the Left Bank where the Red Cross had a terminus center for returning deportees and she found they’d gone to Auschwitz. My friend told me this story one day in the Marais and it touched me. Years later when I returned to Paris in the mid 1990s the story came back to me and I wanted to explore these issues of the past, lingering anti-Semitism and how war still touched every generation. 

She has worked as a preschool teacher and as director of a preschool. Black lives in San Francisco with her husband, Jun Ishimuro, a bookseller. They have a son, Tate.

Works

Aimée Leduc Series 
Murder in the Marais (1998), 
Murder in Belleville (2000), 
Murder in the Sentier (2002), 
Murder in the Bastille (2003), 
Murder in Clichy (2004), 
Murder in Montmartre (2005), 
Murder on the Ile Saint-Louis (2007), 
Murder in the Rue de Paradis (2008), 
Murder in the Latin Quarter (2009), 
Murder in the Palais Royal (2010), 
Murder in Passy (2011), 
Murder at the Lanterne Rouge (2011), 
Murder below Montparnasse (2013), 
Murder in Pigalle (2014), 
Murder on the Champ de Mars (2015), 
Murder on the Quai (2016), 
Murder in Saint-Germain (2017), 
Murder on the Left Bank (2018), 
Murder in Bel-Air (2019), 
Murder at the Porte de Versailles (2022),

Other Novels
Three Hours in Paris (2020),

References

External links 
 Official site
 A mystery writer whose name is noir
 Cara Black, mystery writer
 Aimée Leduc

American mystery writers
American women novelists
Living people
1951 births
San Francisco State University alumni
Writers from Chicago
Writers from San Francisco
Cañada College alumni
20th-century American novelists
21st-century American novelists
Women mystery writers
20th-century American women writers
21st-century American women writers
Novelists from Illinois